Ernő Porubszky (10 May 1913 – 5 May 1997) was a Hungarian weightlifter. He competed in the men's bantamweight event at the 1948 Summer Olympics.

References

1913 births
1997 deaths
Hungarian male weightlifters
Olympic weightlifters of Hungary
Weightlifters at the 1948 Summer Olympics
Sportspeople from Budapest
20th-century Hungarian people